
Gmina Słupsk is a rural gmina (administrative district) in Słupsk County, Pomeranian Voivodeship, in northern Poland.  Its seat is the town of Słupsk, although the town is not part of the territory of the gmina.

The gmina contains part of the protected area called Słupia Valley Landscape Park.

Villages
Gmina Słupsk contains the villages and settlements of Bierkowo, Bruskowo Małe, Bruskowo Wielkie, Bukówka, Bydlino, Gać, Gać Leśna, Gajki, Gałęzinowo, Głobino, Grąsino, Jezierzyce, Jezierzyce-Osiedle, Karżcino, Kępno, Krępa Słupska, Krzemienica, Kukowo, Kusowo, Łękwica, Lubuczewo, Łupiny, Miednik, Niewierowo, Płaszewko, Redęcin, Redzikowo, Redzikowo-Osiedle, Rogawica, Siemianice, Stanięcino, Strzelinko, Strzelino, Swochowo, Swołowo, Warblewko, Warblewo, Wielichowo, Wierzbięcin, Wieszyno, Wiklino, Włynkówko, Włynkowo, Wrzeście and Zamełowo.

Neighbouring gminas
Gmina Słupsk is bordered by the city of Słupsk and by the gminas of Damnica, Dębnica Kaszubska, Główczyce, Kępice, Kobylnica, Postomino, Smołdzino and Ustka.

References
 Central Statistical Office (Poland):  Population. Size and structure of population and vital statistics in Poland by territorial division. As of December 31, 2014

Slupsk
Słupsk County

de:Słupsk#Landgemeinde Słupsk